Epeletia palustris is found in a few marshy areas of páramo, and is endemic to the Venezuelan Andes. Páramo can refer to a variety of alpine tundra ecosystems, and is often described with its geographical confinements in the Andes. It is the ecosystem of the regions above the continuous forest line, yet below the permanent snowline.

It is closely related to E. moritziana, but is different from it in ways like a reduced number of florets in the capitula, much larger ray flowers with longer, more consistent ligulae and also longer linguiform appendages. Its smaller pollen grains, larger cypselae, ebracteate scapes differentiate it from E. moritziana, also its leaves and inflorescences have a more whitish indumentum, it has larger leaf sheaths, and is found in a more marshy habitat than E. moritziana.

The species epithet palustris is Latin for "of the marsh" and indicates its common habitat.

References

 

Millerieae
Páramo flora